Caney is an unincorporated community and coal town in Morgan County, Kentucky, United States.  It lies along Route 191 south of the city of West Liberty, the county seat of Morgan County.  Its elevation is 869 feet (265 m).

References

Unincorporated communities in Morgan County, Kentucky
Unincorporated communities in Kentucky
Coal towns in Kentucky